Dracunculus may refer to:

 Dracunculus (plant), a genus of plants in the family Araceae
 Dracunculus (nematode), a genus of nematodes in the family Dracunculidae